Mixe may refer to:

 Mixe people, an ethnic group of Oaxaca, Mexica
 Mixe languages, the group of languages spoken by them
 Sierra Mixe, a district in Oaxaca, Mexico
 Roman Catholic Territorial Prelature of Mixes, in Oaxaca, Mexico
 Lit-et-Mixe, a commune in Nouvelle-Aquitaine
 , a historic region of the French Basque Country, which includes the present-day communes of Aïcirits-Camou-Suhast and Uhart-Mixe

See also
 Mis (disambiguation)

Language and nationality disambiguation pages